Houli is a railway station on the Taiwan Railways Administration Taichung line located in Houli District, Taichung, Taiwan.

History
The train station was opened on 15 May 1905. On 4 January 2018, a truck-mounted crane collapsed on overhead power line at the station causing blackout and disrupting electricity supply and train services.

Around the station
 Chang Lien-cheng Saxophone Museum

See also
 List of railway stations in Taiwan

References

1905 establishments in Taiwan
Railway stations in Taichung
Railway stations opened in 1905
Railway stations served by Taiwan Railways Administration